This is a list of nations, as represented by National Olympic Committees (NOCs), that have participated in the Summer Olympic Games between 1896 and 2020 (held in 2021). As of the 2020 Games, all of the current 206 NOCs have participated in at least two editions of the Olympic Games. Athletes from Australia, France, Great Britain, Greece, Italy and Switzerland have competed in all twenty-nine Summer Olympic Games.

History

Early years

Early Games were not clearly documented with respect to participating nations. Competitors from 11 to 16 nations participated in the inaugural 1896 Games, in Athens. Eleven nations (Australia, Austria, Denmark, Great Britain, France, Germany, Greece, Hungary, Sweden, Switzerland, and the United States) are mentioned in the official report for the Games, and the International Olympic Committee (IOC) states that 14 nations were represented.
The NOCs for Bulgaria and Chile each claim that they were represented by a single athlete in Athens. Other sources also list Egypt, Italy, and the Turkish Empire.

While official report was actually the summary of the sporting events held at the 1900 Exposition Universelle and so can not be considered as reliable source, the IOC states that 24 nations participated in the 1900 Summer Olympics in Paris, but additional sources list up to 28 nations, with Haiti, Iran, Luxembourg, and Peru being the additions.
The 1904 Games, held in St. Louis were the first Olympics outside of Europe, with very few top-class athletes from outside the North America taking part, and saw the participation of 12 to 15 nations, including a not yet existing Union of South Africa represented by a Boer team of extras from the Louisiana Purchase Exposition.
Although the Intercalated Games of 1906 are no longer considered official Games of the Olympiad by the IOC, they helped restore the Olympic movement. Participation at subsequent Games grew steadily, with 22 nations in London for 1908 and 28 nations in Stockholm for the 1912 Games.
At these two Games (only), one of the delegations was actually a combined team of athletes from Australia and New Zealand, designated Australasia.
The Games of 1916, planned for Berlin, were cancelled due to World War I.

Inter-war years
After the First World War, the Olympic Games resumed in 1920, in Antwerp. Twenty-nine nations participated, but not Austria, Bulgaria, Germany, Hungary, or Turkey, none of which were invited because of their roles in the war. Several newly created European states, such as Czechoslovakia and Yugoslavia, made their Olympic debut.

The Games grew rapidly for the 1924 Summer Olympics, in Paris, with 44 nations present,
even though Germany was still not invited back to the Games. This situation would change for the 1928 Games where Germany returned to join a total of 46 participating nations.
Competitors from 37 nations travelled to Los Angeles for the 1932 Summer Olympics.
The 1936 Summer Olympics, in Berlin, were attended by 49 nations (a new high) but were highly politicized.
The scheduled Games of 1940 in Tokyo or Helsinki and 1944 in London were each cancelled due to the outbreak of World War II in 1939.

Post-war years and Cold War era

Twelve years after the previous Games, the 1948 Summer Olympics, in London, attracted competitors from 59 nations, including 14 that made their Olympic debut; once again, Germany was not invited to take part, and neither was Japan. The 1952 Games, in Helsinki, again set a new high, with 69 nations participating, including the first appearance by the Soviet Union and People's Republic of China and the return of Germany and Japan. The 1956 Summer Olympics, attended by 67 nations in Melbourne, were the first to be marred by a boycott. Egypt, Iraq, and Lebanon withdrew in response to the Suez Crisis, and the Netherlands, Spain, and Switzerland withdrew in response to the Soviet invasion of Hungary. Because of Australian quarantine restrictions, the equestrian events were held five months earlier in Stockholm, with a total of 29 participating nations, including five nations that did not compete in Melbourne.

Participation by African and Latin American nations increased significantly during the 1960s. A total of 84 nations were represented at the 1960 Summer Olympics, in Rome, 94 nations at the 1964 Games, in Tokyo, and 112 nations at the 1968 Summer Olympics, in Mexico City.
The 1968 Games also marked the first time that West Germany and East Germany competed as independent teams. For the previous three Olympiads (1956–1964), the two NOCs were jointly represented by a united German team. The 1972 Summer Olympics, in Munich, featured 121 nations, the highest total yet.

The next three Games were each marred by significant boycotts. At the 1976 Summer Olympics, in Montreal, only 92 nations were represented.
Twenty-nine African nations (Ivory Coast and Senegal being the only two exceptions) boycotted the Games because of New Zealand's participation, as New Zealand maintained other sporting relations with apartheid South Africa. The largest Olympic boycott took place at the 1980 Games, in Moscow, when only 80 nations participated. The United States led the boycott in protest of the December 1979 Soviet invasion of Afghanistan, and were joined by more than 60 other nations. In response, the 1984 Summer Olympics, in Los Angeles, were boycotted by the Soviet Union and their allies, yet a total of 140 nations did participate.
The 1988 Games, in Seoul, marked a new high, with 160 participating nations.

Recent Games
Several events in the 1990s led to a large increase in participating nations at the Olympic Games. After the dissolution of the Soviet Union, the Baltic states competed as independent nations for the first time since 1936 at the 1992 Games, in Barcelona.
The remaining twelve ex-republics of the Soviet Union competed together as the Unified Team for these Games. A single German team competed for the first time since 1964, after the German reunification in 1990, while the breakup of Yugoslavia resulted in the Olympic debut of new nations.

The Centennial Olympics, in Atlanta, were attended by athletes from 197 nations, including 24 nations making their Summer Games debut. Czechoslovakia had split into the Czech Republic and Slovakia, and all ex-Soviet republics competed as independent nations. The Games continued to grow, with 199 nations represented in Sydney, for the 2000 Summer Games, and 201 nations in Athens, for the 2004 Summer Olympics.

A record number of nations (204) were represented at the 2008 Summer Olympics in Beijing, with Marshall Islands and Tuvalu making their Olympic debut. After competing together as Serbia and Montenegro in 2004, Serbia and Montenegro sent independent teams to Beijing. Only Brunei failed to participate in the Games, after failing to register any athletes for competition.
The 2012 Games in London increased this record to 206 nations, even though only 204 NOCs were represented. Brunei returned to the Games, but athletes from the former Netherlands Antilles competed as Independent Olympic Athletes, after the Netherlands Antilles Olympic Committee's membership in the IOC was withdrawn in 2011 as a consequence of the dissolution of the Caribbean country. One athlete from South Sudan also competed as an independent athlete, since the nation had not yet formed a National Olympic Committee after its independence in 2011.

A further increase occurred in the 2016 Summer Olympics, with 206 nations represented: South Sudanese athletes were able to compete under their nation's flag and Kosovo made their debut as an independent team. There was also a team made up of refugees, made up of athletes from the Democratic Republic of the Congo, Ethiopia, South Sudan and Syria who had fled their home countries and could not compete under their home NOC.

Although the COVID-19 pandemic crisis, the 2020 Summer Olympics in 2021 have also 206 teams represented with the only boycott of North Korea. Russian Olympic Committee although replaced the name of Russia with no national flag and anthem, after doping sanctions.

List of nations

Description
This list includes all 206 current NOCs, 21 obsolete NOCs and 3 other entries, arranged alphabetically. The three-letter country code is also listed for each NOC. Since the 1960s, these codes have been frequently used by the IOC and each Games organizing committee to identify NOCs, such as within the official report of each Games. However, in this section, several countries uses long-form names designated by the United Nations uses short form common names such as for example: Laos (Lao People's Democratic Republic), North Korea (Democratic People's Republic of Korea), and Moldova (Republic of Moldova).

Several nations have changed during their Olympic history. Name changes due to geographical renaming are explained by footnotes after the nation's name, and other notes are explained by footnotes linked within the table itself.

Obsolete nations
Obsolete nations are included in the table to more clearly illustrate past Olympic appearances for their successor nations.
ANZ. In the 1908 and 1912 Games, athletes from Australia and New Zealand competed together as a single team, designated Australasia (ANZ).
ROC. The Republic of China (ROC) was designated as China from 1932 to 1948, representing all of China (including Taiwan at the 1948 Games). After the Chinese Civil War, Taiwan participated using the Republic of China designation in 1956, 1960, and 1972.
BOH, TCH. Prior to the foundation of Czechoslovakia after World War I, athletes from Bohemia (BOH) (now part of the present-day Czech Republic) competed in 1900, 1908, and 1912. Czechoslovakia (TCH) participated in 1920–1992, from 1996 represented by two successor NOCs of Czech Republic (CZE) and Slovakia (SVK).
SAA, EUA, FRG, GDR. Due to the partition of Germany after World War II, Germany was represented by two teams at the 1952 Games—Germany and the Saar (SAA). The Saar was reintegrated back into the Federal Republic of Germany in 1956, and Saar athletes then competed for Germany. East Germany did not contribute athletes to the 1952 team, as the National Olympic Committee for the German Democratic Republic was only granted "provisional" recognition by the IOC in 1955. For the Games of 1956–1964, Germany participated as a United Team of Germany (GER), representing the National Olympic Committees of both East Germany and West Germany. Retrospectively, the IOC uses the country code EUA for this team. After the NOC for the German Democratic Republic was granted full recognition by the IOC in 1968, East Germany (GDR) and West Germany (FRG) participated as two distinct teams at the Games of 1968–1988.
MAL, NBO. Prior to the formation of the Federation of Malaysia in 1963, athletes from Malaya (MAL) competed at the 1956 Games and 1960 Games, and athletes from North Borneo (NBO) competed at the 1956 Games.
AHO. The NOC of the Netherlands Antilles (AHO) was recognized by the IOC from 1950 until 2011 upon the dissolution of the Netherlands Antilles.
RU1, URS, EUN, ROC. The Russian Empire (RU1) participated in three Games prior to World War I. Soviet Union (URS) participated at the Games of 1952–1988. After the dissolution of the Soviet Union in 1991, the fifteen ex-republics of the Soviet Union were all represented at the 1992 Summer Olympics. Estonia, Latvia, and Lithuania participated as independent teams, and the other twelve nations participated as a combined Unified Team (EUN). Since 1996 they are represented by fifteen successor NOCs. Russian athletes competed as the Russian Olympic Committee (ROC) at the 2020 Summer Olympics due to doping-related sanctions.
YUG, IOP, SCG. The Kingdom of Yugoslavia (officially the Kingdom of Serbs, Croats and Slovenes until 1929) participated as Yugoslavia (YUG) in five Games before the Second World War. The Socialist Federal Republic of Yugoslavia also participated using the Yugoslavia (YUG) designation, for all Games between 1948–1988. Because of United Nations sanctions in Security Council Resolution 757, athletes from the Federal Republic of Yugoslavia (Serbia and Montenegro) competed as Independent Olympic Participants (IOP) at the 1992 Games. They were not permitted to compete in team sports such as basketball, handball, or water polo, and the Olympic flag was used in medal ceremonies. Athletes from the Republic of Macedonia also competed as Independent Olympic Participants (IOP) at the 1992 Games because their NOC had not been formed. The Federal Republic of Yugoslavia (later State Union of Serbia and Montenegro), consisting of the Republic of Serbia and the Republic of Montenegro, participated at the Games of 1996 and 2000 as Yugoslavia (YUG), and at the Games of 2004 as Serbia and Montenegro (SCG). In 2008 and 2012, the former republics of Yugoslavia were represented by six successor NOCs. In 2016, the autonomous province of Kosovo, which declared independence in 2008 and is partially recognised as a sovereign state, became the seventh successor NOC.
BWI. Athletes from Barbados, Jamaica, and Trinidad and Tobago competed as the British West Indies (BWI) at the 1960 Games. The West Indies Federation only existed as a nation from 1958–1962, so the constituent nations once again competed independently in 1964.
YMD, YAR. Prior to Yemenite unification in 1990, North Yemen participated as the Yemen Arab Republic (YAR) in 1984 and 1988, and South Yemen participated as the Yemen Democratic Republic (YMD) in the 1988 Games.

Other entries
ZZX. Between 1896 and 1904 Olympic Games allowed for individuals in a team, designated later as Mixed teams, to be from different nations.
IOA. Athletes from Timor-Leste competed as Individual Olympic Athletes (IOA) at the 2000 Games. Athletes from the former Netherlands Antilles and South Sudan competed as Independent Olympic Athletes (IOA) at the 2012 Games. Athletes from Kuwait competed as Independent Olympic Athletes (IOA) at the 2016 Games.
ROT. Owing to the refugee crisis, a refugee team was formed at the 2016 Summer Olympics. It consists of athletes from the Democratic Republic of Congo, Ethiopia, South Sudan  and Syria, who have fled their home countries and cannot compete under the home NOC. It returned for the 2020 Summer Olympics and was expanded to include athletes from Afghanistan, Cameroon, Congo, Eritrea, Iran, Iraq, Sudan and Venezuela.

Table legend

Alphabetical list

Notes

Name changes notes

Participation notes

See also

 List of participating nations at the Winter Olympic Games
 List of participating nations at the Summer Paralympic Games
 List of IOC country codes
 Lists of National Olympic Committees by continental association:
 Association of National Olympic Committees of Africa
 European Olympic Committees
 Oceania National Olympic Committees
 Olympic Council of Asia
 Pan American Sports Organisation

References

External links
 Olympic Games. International Olympic Committee
 Olympic Review and Revue Olympique. library.la84.org
 Official Reports. library.la84.org

 
Participating Nations At The Summer Olympic Games